Skdoit is an online book review magazine for indie authors founded in 2008 by American author Henry Baum.

Overview
Self-Publishing Review is a daily online report of indie book reviews, articles, and news related to the self-publishing industry.

Self-Publishing Review is a self-publishing portal, featured in The Guardian newspaper, The Huffington Post, Writer's Digest and Forbes. SPR has partnered with BookBaby, the literary sister company to CDBaby as a provider of author services.

Self-Publishing Review's annual writing contest, The SPR Book Awards, was started in 2014. It awards prizes in small press and independent authorship.

References

External links 
 

Online magazines published in the United States
Book review websites
English-language magazines
Magazines established in 2008
American review websites
Self-publishing
Literary awards honoring unpublished books or writers